The 2017–18 Vegas Golden Knights season was the inaugural season for the Vegas Golden Knights. They played their home games at T-Mobile Arena on the Las Vegas Strip in Paradise, Nevada.

The Golden Knights enjoyed the strongest debut season for an expansion team in North American professional sports history. On February 1, 2018, they broke the record for most wins by an expansion team in their first season when they earned their 34th win of the season. On February 21, they broke the record for most points by an expansion team in their inaugural season when they got their 84th point of the season. Then on March 26, they became the first team to make the playoffs in their inaugural season in the league since the Edmonton Oilers and Hartford Whalers in the 1979–80 season. Following that achievement, on March 31, 2018, with a 3–2 victory over the San Jose Sharks, the Knights became the first modern-era expansion team from any of the four major sports and the first NHL team since the 1926–27 New York Rangers to win their division in their inaugural season (excluding the 1967–68 Philadelphia Flyers, as all teams in the West Division that year were expansion teams). The Golden Knights finished the regular season with a .665 points percentage; prior to 2018 the only examples of first year expansion teams joining any of the North American major professional sports leagues after their respective league's first decade and finishing with a winning/points percentage of .500 or better were teams that had joined from another league.

Earning a playoff berth in their first season, the Golden Knights eliminated the Los Angeles Kings in four straight games during the First Round, becoming the first team in NHL history to sweep their first playoff series in their inaugural season. They later defeated the San Jose Sharks in the Second Round in six games and advanced to the Western Conference Finals. There they defeated the Winnipeg Jets in five games to advance to the Stanley Cup Finals in their inaugural season where they faced the Washington Capitals, and lost in five games.

Standings

Schedule and results

Preseason
A preliminary preseason schedule was announced in January 2017. The draft schedule was released in April 2017, while the final schedule was released in June 2017.

Regular season
The regular season schedule was released on June 22, 2017.

Playoffs

Player statistics
Final stats

Skaters

Goaltenders

Awards and honours

Milestones

Transactions
The Golden Knights have been involved in the following transactions during the 2017–18 season.

Trades

Free agents acquired

Free agents lost

Claimed via waivers

Lost via waivers

Players released

Lost via retirement

Player signings

Draft picks

Expansion draft
The team filled its initial roster by selecting players in the 2017 NHL Expansion Draft on June 21, 2017. They were required to select or sign one player, who was not protected, from each existing team. In return for not selecting certain unprotected players, Vegas made several deals to grant concessions with some teams.

Entry draft

Before the draft lottery, the Golden Knights were given the same odds as the team with the third worst point total from the 2016–17 season, which meant that they would not draft any lower than sixth overall and would draft third in each subsequent round. On April 30, 2017, the Golden Knights received a sixth overall pick in the 2017 NHL Entry Draft during the draft lottery.

Below are the Vegas Golden Knights' selections at the 2017 NHL Entry Draft, which was held on June 23 and 24, 2017, at the United Center in Chicago.

Notes:
 The Winnipeg Jets' first-round pick went to the Vegas Golden Knights as the result of a trade on June 21, 2017, that sent Columbus' first-round pick in 2017 to Winnipeg in exchange for Vegas selecting Chris Thorburn in the 2017 NHL Expansion Draft from Winnipeg, a third-round pick in 2019 and this pick.
 The New York Islanders' first-round pick went to the Vegas Golden Knights as the result of a trade on June 21, 2017, that ensured that Vegas selected Jean-Francois Berube in the 2017 NHL Expansion Draft from the Islanders in exchange for Mikhail Grabovski, Jake Bischoff, a second-round pick in 2019 and this pick.
 The Pittsburgh Penguins' second-round pick went to the Vegas Golden Knights as the result of a trade on June 22, 2017, that sent Trevor van Riemsdyk and a seventh-round pick in 2018 to Carolina in exchange for this pick.
 The Boston Bruins' fifth-round pick went to the Vegas Golden Knights as the result of a trade on June 21, 2017, that ensured that Vegas selected Connor Brickley in the 2017 NHL Expansion Draft from Carolina in exchange for this pick.
 The Buffalo Sabres' sixth-round pick went to the Vegas Golden Knights as the result of a trade on June 21, 2017, that ensured that Vegas selected William Carrier in the 2017 NHL Expansion Draft from Buffalo in exchange for this pick.

References

Vegas Golden Knights seasons
Vegas
Vegas
Western Conference (NHL) championship seasons
2017 in sports in Nevada
2018 in sports in Nevada
Events in Paradise, Nevada